The Kapuas mud snake (Enhydris gyii ) is a species of snake in the family Homalopsidae. The species, which is native to Borneo, can change its epidermal colour spontaneously.

Etymology
The common name, Kapuas mud snake, refers to the Kapuas River. The specific name, gyii, is in honor of Burmese herpetologist Dr Ko Ko Gyi.

Colour change
The Kapuas mud snake's chameleon-like behaviour was discovered accidentally in 2005 when a specimen was put in a dark bucket. The snake's skin turned pale white 20 minutes later. Scientists determined the snake to be a new species belonging to the genus Enhydris.

Description

Venom
Like all members of the subfamily Homalopsinae, E. gyii is rear-fanged and mildly venomous.

Reproduction
Enhydris gyii is viviparous.

References

Further reading
Murphy, John C.; Harold K. Voris (2014). "A Checklist and Key to the Homalopsid Snakes (Reptilia, Squamata, Serpentes), with the Description of New Genera". Fieldiana: Life and Earth Sciences (8): 1-43. (Homalophis gyii, new combination, p. 23).

External links

http://animalpicturesarchive.com/view.php?tid=2&did=22635 

Enhydris
Reptiles described in 2005